is a private women's college in Niiza, Saitama, Japan, established in 1965. The predecessor of the school was founded in 1875.

Atomi Junior College

was a private junior college in Bunkyo Ward, in Tokyo, Japan. It was founded in 1950 and closed in 2007. It teaches Japanese, English and life art.

Alumni 
 Kanoko Okamoto, a novelist
 Michiko Yamamoto, a novelist
 Kyōko Okazaki, a manga artist

External links
 Official website 
 Official website 

Educational institutions established in 1875
Private universities and colleges in Japan
Universities and colleges in Saitama Prefecture
1875 establishments in Japan
Women's universities and colleges in Japan
Niiza, Saitama